Strike Back: Shadow Warfare, as it is known in the United Kingdom is a ten-part British-American action television serial and is the fourth series of Strike Back. It was commissioned by BSkyB and Cinemax on 3 October 2012 and first broadcast on 9 August 2013 on Cinemax and 28 October 2013 on Sky1. Philip Winchester, Sullivan Stapleton, Rhona Mitra, and Michelle Lukes returned as the main cast for the series.

In the series, focus is on Section 20's pursuit of elusive terrorist al-Zuhari, and his cartel partners, across several global locales including Colombia, Beirut, and Europe.

Episodes

Cast
Returning cast members for the series include Philip Winchester and Sullivan Stapleton, who return as protagonists Sergeant Michael Stonebridge and ex–Delta Force operative Sergeant Damian Scott, respectively, Rhona Mitra as Major Rachel Dalton, the head of Section 20 in Strike Back: Vengeance, the previous season, Michelle Lukes as Sergeant Julia Richmond, and Liam Garrigan as Sergeant Liam Baxter. Other cast members will be introduced in the series. Robson Green will appear as a new member of Section 20, new commanding officer Lieutenant Colonel Philip Locke. Dougray Scott will appear as James Leatherby, a rogue operative. Milauna Jackson will be introduced as U.S. DEA agent Kim Martinez, who will be working with Section 20. Zubin Varla plays Leo Kamali, a CIA operative, undercover with a terrorist group, whose loyalties are suspect. Martin Clunes will play Sebastian Grey, a former MI6 officer now working in Beirut. Swedish actor Andreas Utterhall will portray a computer genius who is forced to work for the Russian mafia.

Production
On 3 October 2012, Cinemax and Sky1 announced the renewal of Strike Back for a fourth series, the third with Cinemax's participation. Michael J. Bassett, Julian Holmes and Paul Wilmshurst return as directors, whilst Simon Burke, James Dormer, John Simpson and Richard Zajdlic return as series writers. The series was produced by Left Bank Pictures, with company director Andy Harries serving as executive producer, with Michael Casey as series producer. Co-executive producers include Bassett, Dormer and Tim Vaughan, with Selwyn Roberts and Chris Thompson as producers and Bill Shepard as the co-producer. Consultants who work in counterterrorism, return as advisers to provide insight into the environment. Like past seasons, the cast receive military training so that they can perform most of their own stunts. Production of the series began in January 2013, and took six months to complete. Filming began in South Africa, used to double Beirut and Colombia for the first four episodes. The first two episodes features water sequences, which were filmed at the KwaZulu-Natal province. In March 2013, production moved to Budapest, Hungary to double as several Eastern European locations for the remainder of the series until filming concluded in June.

Release

Broadcast and ratings
In the United States the season premiered at the 10 p.m. time slot on Friday, 9 August 2013 on Cinemax. It premiered with 493,000 viewers on its first broadcast, with 195,000 of those viewers aged from 18 to 49 years, signifying a 0.2 rating in that demographic. Ratings were a rise of over 100,000 from the premiere of Vengeance. In the United Kingdom, Shadow Warfare will premiere at 9 p.m. on Monday, 28 October 2013.

Critical reactions
The American review site Metacritic rated the series a 78 out of 100, indicating "generally favorable reviews" from five critical reviews.

Notes

References

External links
 Strike Back at Sky1
 Strike Back  at Cinemax
 

2013 American television seasons
2013 British television seasons
Strike Back (TV series)
Works about the Russian Mafia